"Before I Go" is a song by Australian singer Guy Sebastian. It was written by Sebastian and Jamie Hartman and released on 2 November 2018 as the lead single from Sebastian's ninth studio album T.R.U.T.H..

The song was the most added song on Australian radio in the week of release.

Background
In a statement, Sebastian said: "This was the very first song I wrote when I sat down to start this new album and it says so much about what I was feeling at the time. In fact, the vocal is still the demo vocal from the writing session because it just felt honest."

Music video
The music video was directed by James Chappell and produced by Linzee Harris and PLAYTIME. It tells the story of a boy and girl, and how they were bullied and physically abused. They turn out to become stars as ice skating athletes played by Australian skaters Andrew Dodds and Chantelle Kerry.

Reception
Jas H from Amnpify said: "'Before I Go' brings the singer songwriter's vocals and soaring delivery to an emotive and captivating place, setting the tone and anticipation around his forthcoming new music." He added: "The new song is about self belief and taking control of your own destiny and legacy regardless of the limitations people or obstacles in your path may place over you". Universal Publishing Group said "The powerful anthem runs with soulful and passionate depths, reaching new heights with its catchiness and honesty."

Charts

Weekly charts

Year-end charts

Certifications

Release history

References

2018 singles
Guy Sebastian songs
Sony Music Australia singles
Songs written by Guy Sebastian
Songs written by Jamie Hartman
2018 songs
Soul ballads